Peter Sturrock may refer to:
 Peter A. Sturrock (born 1924), British physicist
 Peter Sturrock (MP) (1820–1904), Scottish civil engineer, colliery owner and Conservative politician